The Sign of Love ( or A Chit Thinketa) is a Burmese dramatic television series, the first Burmese language series to be aired on Burmese television stations. Season 1 aired from April 30 to May 29, 2012 for 22 episodes. Season 2 aired from October 8 to November 2, 2012 for 20 episodes. Season 3 aired from March 20 to April 16, 2013 for 20 episodes.

The Sign of Love third season, with its season premiere on 18 March 2013. The series was entered into the 2013 Seoul International Drama Awards.

The series is jointly produced by two local directors, Kaung Zan and Htin Kyaw, and a French team led by director Benoit de Lorme. The selected cast consists of relatively unknown actors. The series' screenwriters include J. Dennis C Teodosio and Aye Kyi Tha Han.

Cast and characters
Myat Thu Kyaw as Nay Min Khant
Soe Nandar Kyaw as Myat Noe Khin
Wint Yamone Naing as Mar Yar Cho
Kaung Myat San as Ye Naing
Phone Shein Htet as Wunna
Hsaung Wutyee May as Phyu Sin Shin Thant
May Myint Mo as Nan Mo
Pyay Phyo Aung as Lin Let
Soe Moe Kyi as Daw Nan Tin May Khant
Than Than Soe as Daw Myat Myat Khin
Win Myaing as U Thiha
Yan Kyaw as U Thant Khin
Zaw Maing as U Dibba
Hla Hla Win as Phwar Zar Yu

References

Burmese television series
2012 television series debuts
2013 television series endings
MRTV (TV network) original programming